Andergrove is a northern urban locality in Mackay in the Mackay Region, Queensland, Australia.

Geography 
Andergrove has been steadily growing as a suburban community since 1990s and the housing stock is mostly low-set brick homes.

History 
Andergrove State School opened on 21 February 1939.

Pioneer State High School opened on 28 January 1986. At that time, Andergrove was in the Pioneer Shire, which was amalgamated into City of Mackay in 1994.

MacKillop Catholic Primary School opened in 1995.

In the 2011 census, Andergove had a population of 9,372 people.

Education 
Andergrove State School is a government primary (Prep-6) school for boys and girls at Fernleigh Avenue. In 2017, the school had an enrolment of 368 students with 35 teachers (27 full-time equivalent) and 22 non-teaching staff (14 full-time equivalent). It includes a special education program.

Pioneer State High School is a government secondary (7-12) school for boys and girls at Bedford Road. In 2017, the school had an enrolment of 560 students with 56 teachers (51 full-time equivalent) and 34 non-teaching staff (27 full-time equivalent).  It includes a special education program.

MacKillop Catholic Primary School is a Catholic primary (Prep-6) school for boys and girls at 20 Nadarmi Drive. In 2017, the school had an enrolment of 234 students with 17 teachers (15 full-time equivalent) and 13 non-teaching staff (8 full-time equivalent).

Amenities 
Northside Mackay Uniting Church is at  244-246 Bedford Road.

Mackay Church of Christ is at 65 Beaconsfield Rd East.

References

External links
 

Mackay Region
Suburbs of Mackay, Queensland
Localities in Queensland